Stalling is a surname. Notable people with this surname include:

Carl Stalling (1891–1972), American composer and arranger
Jonathan Stalling (born 1975), American poet, scholar, editor, translator, professor, and inventor
Max Stalling (born 1966), American country music singer/songwriter

See also
Stallings (surname)